John Grace (16 November 1886 – 8 December 1972) was a British Conservative Party politician. He sat in the House of Commons in the 1920s.

Political career 
At the 1924 general election, Grace was elected as the Member of Parliament (MP) for the Wirral division of Cheshire, defeating the one-term Liberal MP Stephen Roxby Dodds. He was re-elected in 1929, and held the seat until he stood from Parliament at the 1931 general election.

References

External links 
 
 

1886 births
1972 deaths
Conservative Party (UK) MPs for English constituencies
UK MPs 1924–1929
UK MPs 1929–1931